Bids for Commonwealth Games is the process where Commonwealth Games Associations select from within their national territory cities to put forward bids to host a Commonwealth Games. Since the creation of the Commonwealth Games Federation in 1932, which successfully appropriated the name of the Inter-Empire Championships to create a modern sporting event for the members of the Commonwealth, interested cities have rivalled for selection as host of the Commonwealth Games.

What follows is a list of the cities that have bid to host any of the Commonwealth Games. 20 cities (including repeats) have been chosen to host the Commonwealth Games; four in America, two in Asia, six in Europe, one in the Caribbean and seven in Oceania. No African city has ever been chosen to host a Commonwealth Games.

Process 
The General Assembly of the CGF is responsible for deciding who will host the Commonwealth Games, 8 years prior to the games in question once all bids have been submitted. The selection process is made in accordance with the Candidate City Manual, as drafted by the Executive Board and made available to candidates 18 months before a decision is made. The federation then entrusts the organisation of the games to the organising committee, CGA, and government of the winning host nation or territory, including the security and finance, but is still monitored by the federation.

Commonwealth Games

Notes

References 

Commonwealth Games
Commonwealth Games bids
Commonwealth Games-related lists